Uzair is a figure who is mentioned in the Quran, Surah At-Tawba, verse , which states that he was revered by the Jews as "the son of God". Modern historians have described the reference as "enigmatic", since such views have not been found in Jewish sources. Islamic scholars have interpreted the Quranic reference in different ways, with some explaining that it alluded to a specific group of Jews.

According to Ibn Kathir, Uzair lived between the times of King Solomon and the time of Zachariah, father of John the Baptist (Yahya). Some Quranic commentators viewed Uzayr as a learned scholar who sought to teach the people the forgotten laws of God. He is sometimes identified as the protagonist in the Quranic story of the man who slept for a hundred years (2:259). Some Islamic scholars held Uzayr to be one of the prophets. Although there is a hadith that reports that God expunged Uzayr from the list of prophets because he refused to believe in qadar (predestination), but this hadith is considered da'if (weak) and is rejected by most Islamic scholars.Ibn Hazm, al-Samaw'al and other scholars put forth the view that Uzair (or one of his disciples) falsified the Torah, and this claim became a common theme in Islamic polemics against the Bible. Many aspects of later Islamic narratives show similarity to Vision of Ezra, an apocryphal text which seems to have been partially known to Muslim readers.

Classical Muslim scholars who were aware of Jewish and Christian denials of belief in the sonship of Ezra, explained that it was only one Jew or a small group of Jews who worshipped Uzayr, or that the verse refers to the extreme admiration of Jews for their doctors of law.

Authors of the 1906 Jewish Encyclopedia viewed the Quranic reference as a "malevolent metaphor" for the reverence accorded to Ezra in Judaism. Some modern historians have favored the theory that a Jewish sect in Arabia venerated Ezra to the extent of deifying him. Gordon Darnell Newby has suggested that the Quranic expression may have reflected Ezra's possible designation as one of the Bene Elohim (lit. sons of God) by Jews of the Hejaz. Other scholars proposed emendations of the received spelling of the name, leading to readings ‘Uzayl (‘Azazel), ‘Azīz, or Azariah (Abednego).

Quranic context
The Quran states that Jews exalted Ezra as a son of God:
The Jews say, “Ezra is the son of God,” while the Christians say, “Christ is the son of God.” Such are their baseless assertions, only parroting the words of earlier disbelievers. May God condemn them! How can they be deluded ˹from the truth˺?  -

In February 624, when the qibla (direction of prayer) changed from Jerusalem to Mecca. Sallam ibn Mishkam, a Jew who lived in Medina and his friends asked Muhammad: “How can we follow you when you have abandoned our qibla and you do not allege that Uzair (Ezra) is the son of God?” This verse is situated in a context of theological disputes with the Jewish community of Medina. The Quran emphasizes the absolute divinity of God and warns against associating any being with him (shirk). It further condemns Jewish and Christian leaders of the time for deceiving the masses into taking "their priests and their anchorites to be their lords in derogation of God". In casting doubt on claims about the divine status of Uzayr and Christ, the Quran also instructs Muslims to reject such beliefs. These arguments reflect the tensions between the Muslim, Christian and Jewish communities of Arabia.

Islamic tradition and literature

In some Islamic texts, Ezra is identified as the person mentioned in Qur'an 2:259:
Or ˹are you not aware of˺ the one who passed by a city which was in ruins. He wondered, “How could God bring this back to life after its destruction?” So God caused him to die for a hundred years then brought him back to life. God asked, “How long have you remained ˹in this state˺?” He replied, “Perhaps a day or part of a day.” God said, “No! You have remained here for a hundred years! Just look at your food and drink—they have not spoiled. ˹But now˺ look at ˹the remains of˺ your donkey! And ˹so˺ We have made you into a sign for humanity. And look at the bones ˹of the donkey˺, how We bring them together then clothe them with flesh!” When this was made clear to him, he declared, “˹Now˺ I know that God is Most Capable of everything.”  -

The history text Zubdat-al Tawarikh, dedicated to Ottoman Sultan Murad III in 1583, narrates a story of Uzair's grief for the destruction of Jerusalem. His grief is said to have been so great that God took his soul and brought him back to life after Jerusalem was reconstructed. In the miniature accompanying the manuscript, the building on the lower right depicts the rebuilt city of Jerusalem in the form a typical sixteenth-century Ottoman building with a dome and an arched portico. The former ruins of Jerusalem are alluded to by the broken arches and columns on the left.

According to the classical Quranic exegete, Ibn Kathir, after Ezra questioned how the resurrection will take place on the Day of judgment, God had him brought back to life many years after he died. He rode on his revived donkey and entered his native place. But the people did not recognize him, nor did his household, except the maid, who was now an old blind woman. He prayed to God to cure her blindness and she could see again. He meets his son who recognized him by a mole between his shoulders and was older than he was. Ezra then led the people to locate the only surviving copy of Torah as the remaining were burnt by Nebuchadnezzar. It was rotting and crumpled, so Ezra had a new copy of the Torah made which he had previously memorized. He thus renovated the Torah to the Children of Israel. Ibn Kathir mentions that the sign in the phrase "And that We may make of thee a sign unto the people" was that he was younger than his children. After this miracle, Ibn Kathir writes that Jews began to claim that Ezra was the 'son of God'.

The modern Quranic exegesis of Abul Ala Maududi states:

According to Maulana Muhammad Ali's Quranic commentary, there indeed existed a group of Jews who venerated Ezra as the son of God. According to Ali, Qastallani held that in the Kitan al-Nikah, that there was a party of Jews who held this belief.

Alleged falsification of scripture

Ibn Hazm, an Andalusian Muslim scholar, explicitly accused Ezra of being a liar and a heretic who falsified and added interpolations into the Biblical text. Ibn Hazm provided a polemical list of what he considered "chronological and geographical inaccuracies and contradictions; theological impossibilities (anthropomorphic expressions, stories of fornication and whoredom, and the attributing of sins to prophets), as well as lack of reliable transmission (tawatur) of the text", Hava Lazarus-Yafeh states. In response to attacks on the personality of Ezra, the Byzantine Emperor Leo III defended Ezra as a pious, reliable person. The Jewish convert to Islam al-Samaw'al (d. 1175) accused Ezra of interpolating stories such as Gen. 19:30-8 in the Bible in order to sully David’s origins and to prevent the rule of the Davidic dynasty during the second Temple.
The writings of Ibn Hazm and al-Samaw'al was adopted and updated only slightly by later Muslim authors up to contemporary times.

Jewish tradition and literature
As in Islam, a fundamental tenet of Judaism is that God is not bound by any limitations of time, matter, or space, and that the idea of any person being God, a part of God, or a mediator to God, is heresy. The Book of Ezra, which Judaism accepts as a chronicle of the life of Ezra and which predates Muhammad and the Qur'an by around 1000 years, gives Ezra's human lineage as being the son of Seraiah and a direct descendant of Aaron. Tractate Ta'anit of the Jerusalem Talmud, which predates Muhammad by two to three hundred years, states that “if a man claims to be God, he is a liar.” Exodus Rabba 29 says, "'I am the first and I am the last, and beside Me there is no God' I am the first, I have no father; I am the last, I have no brother. Beside Me there is no God; I have no son." However the term 'sons of gods' occurs in Genesis. The Encyclopedia of Judaism clarifies that the title of 'son of God' is attributed a person whose piety has placed him in a very near relationship to God and "by no means carries the idea of physical descent from, and essential unity with, God".

The title of son of God (servant of God) is used by the Jews for any pious person as is evident according to Encyclopedia of Judaism which states that the title of son of God is attributed by the Jews "to any one whose piety has placed him in a filial relation to God (see Wisdom ii. 13, 16, 18; v. 5, where "the sons of God" are identical with "the saints"; comp. Ecclus. [Sirach] iv. 10). It is through such personal relations that the individual becomes conscious of God's fatherhood." Jews consider Ezra among the pious.

The Quranic verse on Ezra appears in one of Maimonides's discussions about the relationship between Judaism and Islam where he says “…they [Muslims] lie about us [Jews], and falsely attribute to us the statement that God has a son.”

Abraham Geiger, the founder of Reform Judaism, remarked the following concerning the claim that Jews believed Ezra to be the son of God: “According to the assertion of Muhammad the Jews held Ezra to be the Son of God. This is certainly a mere misunderstanding which arose from the great esteem in which Ezra was undoubtedly held. This esteem is expressed in the following passage ‘Ezra would have been worthy to have made known the law if Moses had not come before him.’ Truly Muhammad sought to cast suspicion on the Jews’ faith in the unity of God, and thought he had here found a good opportunity of so doing.”

Historical analysis

God says in the Quran that the Jews considered Uzair the "son of God". However, these words are disbelieved by all Jews today.

In A History of the Jews of Arabia: From Ancient Times to Their Eclipse under Islam, scholar Gordon Darnell Newby notes the following on the topic of Uzair, the angel Metatron and the Bene Elohim (lit. "Sons of God"):
...we can deduce that the inhabitants of Hijaz during Muhammad's time knew portions, at least, of 3 Enoch in association with the Jews. The angels over which Metatron becomes chief are identified in the Enoch traditions as the sons of God, the Bene Elohim, the Watchers, the fallen ones as the causer of the flood. In 1 Enoch, and 4 Ezra, the term Son of God can be applied to the Messiah, but most often it is applied to the righteous men, of whom Jewish tradition holds there to be no more righteous than the ones God elected to translate to heaven alive. It is easy, then, to imagine that among the Jews of the Hijaz who were apparently involved in mystical speculations associated with the merkabah, Ezra, because of the traditions of his translation, because of his piety, and particularly because he was equated with Enoch as the Scribe of God, could be termed one of the Bene Elohim. And, of course, he would fit the description of religious leader (one of the ahbar of the Qur'an 9:31) whom the Jews had exalted.

According to Reuven Firestone, there is evidence of groups of Jews venerating Ezra to an extent greater than mainstream Judaism, which fits with the interpretation that the verse merely speaks of a small group of Jews. The book 2 Esdras, a non-canonical book attributed to Babylonian captivity, associates a near-divine or angelic status to Ezra. Mark Lidzbarski and Michael Lodahl have also hypothesized existence of an Arabian Jewish sect whose veneration of Ezra bordered on deification.

The 1906 Jewish Encyclopedia states:
"In the Koran (ix. 30) the Jews are charged with worshiping Ezra ("'Uzair") as the son of God—a malevolent metaphor for the great respect which was paid by the Jews to the memory of Ezra as the restorer of the Law, and from which the Ezra legends of apocryphal literature (II Esd. xxxiv. 37-49) originated (as to how they developed in Mohammedan legends see Damiri, "Ḥayat al-Ḥayawan," i. 304-305). It is hard to bring into harmony with this the fact, related by Jacob Saphir ("Eben Sappir," i. 99), that the Jews of South Arabia have a pronounced aversion for the memory of Ezra, and even exclude his name from their category of proper names."

Rabbi Allen Maller states that there is a hadith in Jami` at-Tirmidhi which states that Jews worship their rabbis, because they accept what their rabbis say over the Word of God. He affirms this to be true because Orthodox Jews practice Judaism based on the rabbi's interpretation of the oral Torah. He also cites that ibn Abbas narrated that four Jews believed that Uzayr was the son of God.

Identification with Osiris and Metatron
Some modern scholar identify Uzair with Osiris (pronounced wsjr), the ancient Egyptian God, who was considered to be resurrected from dead. Osiris is considered to be the son of the deity Geb. Some of the pagan traditions while in exile might have adopted by some Jews and the Qur'anic verse could be referring to this, similar to the story of the worship of the golden calf by the Jews. Muslim scholars like Timothy Winter identify Uzair with Metatron, one of the archangels. Ibn Hazm mentions that Jews, although regarding Metatron as an angel, would celebrate Metatron as a lesser god 10 days each year, probably a reference to Rosh Hashanah in connection with Merkabah mysticism that Metatron took part on the creation of the world.

Alternative readings of the name

Some scholars proposed emendations of the received spelling of the name, عزير. Paul Casanova and Steven M. Wasserstrom read the name as ‘Uzayl (عزيل), a variant of Asael (Enoch 6:8) or ‘Azazel (Leviticus 16:8), who is identified in the Jewish Haggada as the leader of the fallen angels called "sons of God" in Genesis 6:2. J. Finkel instead reads the name as ‘Azīz (عزيز, potentate), connecting it to the phrase "thou art my son" in Psalms 2:7.

Viviane Comerro, Professor in Islamic literature at INALCO, considers the possibility of Quranic Uzair not being Ezra but Azariah instead, relying on Ibn Qutaybah, and identifying a confusion committed by Muslim exegetes. She declares : "There is, from Muslim traditionalists, a confusion between two distinct characters, Ezra ['Azrà] et Azariah ['Azarya(h)](...) Thus, it is possible that the quranic vocable Uzayr could find its origin in Azariah's one."

References 

Hebrew Bible people in Islam
At-Tawba
Quran-related controversies